The Niagara Purple Eagles softball team represents Niagara University in the NCAA Division I college softball. The team participates in the Metro Atlantic Athletic Conference (MAAC). The Purple Eagles are currently led by head coach Larry Puzan. The team plays its home games at Niagara Softball Field located on the university's campus.

Year-by-year results

See also
List of NCAA Division I softball programs

References

External links